Trent Park Cemetery is a cemetery run by the Islington and Camden Cemetery Services located in Cockfosters Road, Cockfosters, north London. It is adjacent to Cockfosters tube station and Trent Park.

Style
The cemetery is of a lawn style with only bronze or granite memorial plaques laid flat allowed.

History
Trent Park Cemetery was opened in 1960. It was built on land in agricultural use within Trent Park that originally formed part of Enfield Chase hunting park.

References

External links

 Map of Trent Park Cemetery.
 

Cemeteries in London
Parks and open spaces in the London Borough of Islington
1960 establishments in England
Cockfosters
Trent Park